Inger Juel (18 September 1926 – 12 August 1979) was a Swedish stage and film actress.

Selected filmography
 The Loveliest Thing on Earth (1947)
 Each Heart Has Its Own Story (1948) as Hildegard
 Vi flyr på Rio (1949) as Karin Åhs
 One Fiancée at a Time (1952)
 The Green Lift (1952)
 The Red Horses (1954)
 Café Lunchrasten (1954)
 Dance on Roses (1954)
 Getting Married (1955)
 Line Six (1958)

References

Bibliography 
 Jerry Vermilye. Ingmar Bergman: His Life and Films. McFarland, 2002.

External links 
 

1926 births
1979 deaths
Swedish film actresses